New York State Route 16 (NY 16) is a state highway in western New York, in the United States. It runs from the Pennsylvania state line, where it is one of the highest highways in the state in elevation, to downtown Buffalo. NY 16 is a major route through Erie County, despite the construction of the paralleling NY 400 expressway from East Aurora. In Cattaraugus County it also plays an important role, serving as the major connection from Olean to the Southern Tier Expressway (Interstate 86 or I-86 and NY 17). Between those two areas, and indeed for much of its length, it is a two-lane rural road.

NY 16 initially ended in Olean when it was assigned in 1924. It was extended south to the Pennsylvania state line in the early 1930s; however, it initially overlapped NY 17 east to Portville, where it connected to Pennsylvania by way of modern NY 305. NY 16's current alignment south of Olean was originally designated as New York State Route 16A around this time. NY 16 was rerouted to follow the routing of NY 16A south of Olean in August 1962.

Route description

Cattaraugus County

When PA 646 becomes NY 16 at the state line, it is already at a very high elevation on a ridgecrest, and at a rise two miles (3.2 km) into New York, it reaches  in elevation, making it the highest state highway in western New York and among the highest in the state. It remains at a high elevation for several more miles, through what was once one of New York's major oil fields. Afterwards, NY 16 then begins to drop through a narrow valley to cross the Allegheny River and enter its first major community, the city of Olean (which, like several other communities in the region, takes its name from oil). It crosses the city as Union Street, intersecting its first state highway, NY 417, at State Street. Here, ownership and maintenance of NY 16 shifts to the city for six blocks before becoming state-maintained once more at the point where North Union Street heads northwest to serve North Olean.

A mile (1.6 km) north of NY 417, NY 16 reaches a bridge over Olean Creek, a tributary of the Allegheny. On the other side, it becomes a four-lane road with a divider as it approaches NY 17, currently concurrent with I-86 pending the entire expressway's upgrade to Interstate Highway standards. A trumpet interchange provides access to I-86 and NY 17 in both directions in the vicinity of Baldwin Heights. But NY 16 runs parallel to the freeway and remains a four-lane route, although no longer divided, following the Olean valley. At Hinsdale it finally does cross I-86/NY 17. Shortly afterwards, in the hamlet of Maplehurst, NY 446, the former route of NY 408, comes in from the east and terminates.

NY 16 now follows the narrow valley of Ischua Creek, one of the Olean's tributaries, north past the road to the city's airport, in the town of Ischua, north to Franklinville. NY 98 joins NY 16 just south of the village and leaves north of it. NY 16 continues to Machias and the eastern end of NY 242. The highway veers to the northeast in Machias, turning back to the north at the resort hamlet of Lime Lake. A straight course takes the highway from this junction through the village of Delevan and to the Cattaraugus Creek bridge. This bridge heads into Erie County.

Erie County

In the southeastern corner of the county, NY 16 intersects with NY 39. NY 16 then begins heading slightly northwestward through a wider, more developed valley in the towns of Holland and Wales to the first sign of an approaching major metropolitan area, the south end of NY 400, the Aurora Expressway. After joining the expressway for two miles (3 km), it again leaves to become a two-lane that enters East Aurora as Olean Street. At the intersection with Main Street, NY 16 turns left and briefly joins with U.S. Route 20A (US 20A) and NY 78. US 20A leaves the two state routes behind at a fork at the village's east end, leaving NY 16 and NY 78 to head to the northwest again as Buffalo Street. At this point, NY 16 and NY 78 become county-maintained for the next  as the unsigned County Route 572 (CR 572). At Willardshire Road as the highway passes the industrial parks and other facilities associated with local company Moog Inc. North of the village, it enters the Town of Elma and becomes Seneca Street, the name it will retain all the way to the city.

NY 78 takes on its best-known name as well when it leaves at Transit Road (US 20), as NY 16 assumes an east–west heading across the suburban neighborhoods of West Seneca. It crosses NY 277, a major retail strip, at Union Road in the hamlet of Ebenezer. One final trumpet exit to NY 400 (and by extension, the New York State Thruway) precedes its junction with Harlem Road (NY 240), where county maintenance of NY 16, and thus the overlap with CR 572, ends. Just west of NY 240, NY 16 crosses the Thruway itself as it begins to head to the northwest and enter the city of Buffalo, where the route is locally maintained. Running almost due northwest through the residential neighborhoods of South Buffalo, NY 16 reaches its last major junction, with US 62, at Bailey Avenue just after crossing the Buffalo River. Immediately afterwards it crosses I-190 with no exit (but with northbound access) and returns to a more east–west course through industrial areas before ending at Main Street, NY 5, in the city center.

History

The portion of modern NY 16 between Hinsdale and Buffalo was originally designated as Route 17, an unsigned legislative route, by the New York State Legislature in 1908. At the same time, the segment of what is now NY 16 from Olean to Hinsdale was included in Route 4, a lengthy east–west route that extended from Lake Erie in Chautauqua County to the Hudson River in Orange County. The portion from Olean south to the state line was part of the old "Kittanning Road," a road constructed by the Continental Army during the 1779 Sullivan Expedition that connected Kittanning, Pennsylvania to the Allegheny River; the road is among the oldest roads in the region.

When the first set of posted routes in New York were assigned in 1924, much of Route 4—including the Olean–Hinsdale segment—was designated as NY 17 while legislative Route 17 became part of NY 16, which began in Olean and overlapped with NY 17 along former legislative Route 4 between Olean and Hinsdale.

In the 1930 renumbering of state highways in New York, NY 17 was realigned between Olean and Wellsville to follow modern NY 417, eliminating its overlap with NY 16. By the following year, NY 16 was extended south to the Pennsylvania state line near Portville via NY 17 and what is now NY 305. The modern routing of NY 16 between Pennsylvania and Olean was designated as NY 16A . The alignments of both NY 16 and NY 16A remained the same until August 1962 when NY 16A was supplanted by a rerouted NY 16. The former routing of NY 16 between the Pennsylvania state line and NY 17 became an extension of NY 305.

The portion of the Aurora Expressway (NY 400) between East Aurora and South Wales was completed in the early 1970s. NY 16 was rerouted to follow the new highway for two miles (3 km) before exiting the freeway and returning to its previous alignment.

Major intersections

See also

List of county routes in Erie County, New York (545–580)

References

External links

016
Transportation in Erie County, New York
Transportation in Cattaraugus County, New York